The 2002–03 season saw Brighton & Hove Albion compete in the Football League First Division where they finished in 23rd position with 45 points and were relegated to the Second Division.

Final league table

Results
Brighton & Hove Albion's score comes first

Legend

Football League First Division

FA Cup

Football League Cup

Squad statistics

References

External links
 Brighton & Hove Albion 2002–03 at Soccerbase.com (select relevant season from dropdown list)

2002–03
Brighton and Hove Albion